The 1917 Invercargill mayoral election was held on 25 April 1917 as part of that year's local elections.

Former mayor John Stead defeated the incumbent Duncan McFarlane.

Results
The following table gives the election results:

References

1917 elections in New Zealand
Mayoral elections in Invercargill